Oleh Zhenyukh (born 22 March 1987, Ukrainian SSR, Soviet Union) is a professional Ukrainian football midfielder who plays for FC Volyn Lutsk in the Ukrainian Premier League.

External links
 Profile on Official Karpaty Lviv Website (Ukr)
 Profile on Official FFU Website (Ukr)

1987 births
Living people
Ukrainian footballers
FC Karpaty Lviv players
FC Volyn Lutsk players
Association football midfielders